Colombia is competing at the 2013 World Championships in Athletics in Moscow, Russia, from 10 to 18 August 2013.
A team of 20 athletes was announced to represent the country in the event.

Results
(q – qualified, NM – no mark, SB – season best)

Men
Track and road events

Women
Track and road events

Field events

References

External links
IAAF World Championships 2013 – Colombia

Nations at the 2013 World Championships in Athletics
World Championships in Athletics
Colombia at the World Championships in Athletics